Roland Leslie Green (1 September 1927 – 29 October 2017) was a New Zealand rugby union player. A halfback, Green represented  at a provincial level from 1950 to 1952, playing 19 matches for the union, including its first Ranfurly Shield victory in 1950. When he died in Timaru on 29 October 2017, Green was the last surviving member of the playing XV from that match.

Born on 1 September 1927, Green was the son of Daisy Green (née Aitchison) and Richard Corbett Cooper Green, whose father Isaac Green served four terms as mayor of North East Valley in Dunedin. Isaac Green's brother, James Green, was a New Zealand member of Parliament.

References

1927 births
2017 deaths
Rugby union players from Timaru
New Zealand rugby union players
South Canterbury rugby union players
Rugby union scrum-halves